Peru is a country in western South America. Services account for 53% of Peruvian gross domestic product, followed by manufacturing (22.3%), extractive industries (15%), and taxes (9.7%). Recent economic growth has been fueled by macroeconomic stability, improved terms of trade, and rising investment and consumption. Peru's main exports are copper, gold, zinc, textiles, and fish meal; its major trade partners are the United States, China, Brazil, and Chile.

For further information on the types of business entities in this country and their abbreviations, see "Business entities in Peru".

Notable firms 
This list includes notable companies with primary headquarters located in the country. The industry and sector follow the Industry Classification Benchmark taxonomy. Organizations which have ceased operations are included and noted as defunct.

See also 
 List of airlines of Peru
 List of beverage companies of Peru

References 

Peru